Rafael de Amat i de Cortada (1746–1819), popularly known as Baron of Maldà, was a Catalan writer. He wrote a personal diary called Calaix de sastre in 52 volumes, from 1769 to 1819. Only some pieces have been published.

Catalan-language writers
People from Barcelona
1746 births
1819 deaths